Mark Gilhaney (born 4 November 1984) is a Scottish former footballer who played as a winger. During his career Gilhaney played for Clyde, Cambuslang Rangers (loan), Hamilton Academical, Dundee, Alloa Athletic, Stirling Albion and Dumbarton, before finishing his career with Stenhousemuir.

Career
Gilhaney, a left winger, began his career at Clyde in 2003, where he earned a Scotland U19 cap against a Switzerland U19 team in April 2003. He moved to Hamilton Academical in 2005. He signed a 2-year contract with Dundee on 20 May 2008.

In August 2009, he joined Alloa Athletic, but was released at the end of the season. In August 2010 he signed for Dumbarton following a successful trial period with the club. On 4 May 2013, Gilhaney made his 100th appearance for the club in a 0–0 draw with champions Partick Thistle. Gilhaney signed a new one-year deal for the club in May 2014.

Gilhaney made his 150th appearance for Dumbarton on 31 January 2015, playing the full 90 minutes of a 3–3 draw with Falkirk. He left the club in May after being told he was not in new manager Stephen Aitken's plans. Shortly after leaving Dumbarton, he signed for Scottish League One side Stenhousemuir on a one-year deal. Gilhaney spent two years with Stenhousemuir, before retiring from football at the end of the 2016–17 season at the age of 32.

Honours
Hamilton Academical
Scottish Football League First Division: 2007–08

Dumbarton
Scottish First Division: play-off winners 2011–12

References

External links

Living people
1984 births
Scottish footballers
Clyde F.C. players
Cambuslang Rangers F.C. players
Hamilton Academical F.C. players
Dundee F.C. players
Alloa Athletic F.C. players
Stirling Albion F.C. players
Dumbarton F.C. players
Stenhousemuir F.C. players
Scottish Junior Football Association players
Scottish Football League players
Sportspeople from Lanark
Scottish Professional Football League players
Association football wingers
Footballers from South Lanarkshire